"Cha Cha" is the debut single from Puerto Rican reggaeton singer Chelo from his album 360°. It peaked at No. 16 on the Billboard Hot Latin Tracks chart. Chelo performed the song at Miss Universe 2006 during the swimsuit competition. It's a playable track on the 1994 Wii version of the rhythm game Samba de Amigo.

Music video
The video takes place in an underground club set in the 1920s with Chelo coming onstage in 1920s style clothing with two female dancers before changing into more modern clothing along with club. The two styles eventually converge on each other and they all perform together by the end of the song. The video features the song "Yummy" at the end.

Promo single – track list
Two remixes were commissioned for this song, which have gained some club attention for this song.
English version – 3:14
Spanglish version – 3:15
Dave Aude cha club – 8:09
Dave Aude cha edit – 3:38
Dave Aude cha mixshow – 6:06
Dave's All Nite dub – 7:51
L.E.X. Percussiva Vox Da club mix – 7:29
L.E.X. Percussiva Dub Da club mix – 6:19
L.E.X. Percussiva Mixshow – 5:26
L.E.X. Percussiva radio edit – 3:51
Acapella English – 3:12
Acapella Spanglish – 2:50

Charts

References

1991 songs
Chelo (American singer) songs
Sony BMG Norte singles
1992 debut singles
Spanglish songs